Oliver Mayer is an American playwright, professor, author, essayist and screenwriter currently residing in Los Angeles, California with his wife, the actress Marlene Forte. He is currently employed with the University of Southern California School of Dramatic Arts as a tenured professor of dramatic writing as well as an Associate Dean of Faculty and Associate Dean of Strategic Initiatives. Some of his written works include the plays Blade to the Heat, Members Only and Yerma in the Desert along with several other works which have brought him attention in part for their regular addressing of issues of sexuality and gender rights. As librettist, his collaborations with composers David Conte and Jenni Brandon have led to numerous operas and other sung pieces performed internationally. In addition to his theatrical productions, Oliver Mayer is also a published poet and the co-author of a short, illustrated children's book, Big Dog on Campus, along with Patricia Rae.

Early life and career 
Oliver Mayer was born in Hollywood, California to Gloria and Alexander A. Mayer. His father, Alexander, was an American who worked as an Art director with Universal Studios for more than 20 years before passing away, and his mother was a Mexican American who worked in nursing administration and had an influence over her son's interest in theater as she wanted him to be an actor while he was a child.  In 1978, at the age of 13, Mayer was taken to see the play Zoot Suit, which ultimately served to further inspire him to take up a career in play-writing.

During his childhood, Mayer suffered from bullying and ultimately took up boxing as a means to cope with the pressure.  He took weekly lessons between the ages of 13 and 17.  He then went on to study English and vocal music at Cornell University, and spent his junior year abroad at the University of Oxford where he was inspired to receive a Master of Fine Arts in play writing from Columbia University.

Mayer had his first work produced in 1985 at the age of 20 and returned to Los Angeles, California after college in 1989.  He joined the faculty at the University of Southern California in 2003 and went on to spend seven years interviewing to become a professor with tenure.
Playwright and screenwriter Jose Rivera calls Mayer "A great writer with firebrand dialogue (who) contributes not just as a playwright, but as an educator and a Latino who has kept his roots."

Major works

Yerma in the Desert  
Yerma in the Desert is one of Mayer's more recent theatrical productions that premiered in Los Angeles, California at the Greenway Court Theatre and Urban Theatre Movement in mid-November 2017.  The piece focuses on a woman by the name of Yerma who is being denied romantic intimacy with and by her spouse, Juan, as she is tied to a loveless marriage by the prospect of having children.  The play addresses gender equality in the professional sector, LGBTQ themes and deportations within the United States of America.  Yerma in the Desert is an attempt to capture the message and subject of Federico Garcia Lorca's play, Yerma, in a modern-day setting as the production takes place within a university and is heavily focused on the custodial staff as opposed to the student body.

Blade to the Heat and Members Only 
Among Mayer's more notable works, Blade to the Heat, is a play that centers on two boxers respectively of Mexican American and Cuban heritage, Pedro Quinn and Mantequilla Decima.  Its world premiere was at the Joseph Papp Public Theater in 1994 directed by George C. Wolfe. The work received its West Coast premiere at the Mark Taper Forum in 1996 in Los Angeles, California directed by Ron Link and used music by Jackie Wilson.  Set in the late 1950s, it addresses sexuality in the world of boxing as well as tensions in Latinx identity, as well as Mayer's own experiences with boxing during his teenage years. The sequel to this piece, Members Only, is the most recent of Mayer's theatrical productions and was a work in progress for over six years before performances began on October 25, 2018, at LATC 514 S. Spring Street Los Angeles, California. The play takes place in 1982 and follows the surviving characters as they attempt to forge their identities at the onset of the AIDs pandemic. Among various productions, collaborating actors have included Colman Domingo, Wayne Brady, Justina Machado, Jon Huertas, Marlene Forte, Darrin Henson, Paul Calderon, Raymond Cruz and David Anzuelo.

3 Paderewskis and America Tropical

3 Paderewskis
Winner of the 2019 American Prize for new opera, and commissioned by the Adam Mickiewicz Institute as part of the Paderewski Musical Project, composed by Jenni Brandon with Mayer's libretto, it follows the life and times of Polish pianist/composer/politician and champion winemaker Ignace Jan Paderewski. The opera received its world premiere at The Kennedy Center in Washington D.C. and was also performed at the Aula Nova in Poznan, Poland.

America Tropical
Composed by David Conte with Mayer's libretto, the opera follows the creation and eventual destruction of the America Tropical mural on Olvera Street in Los Angeles in 1932 by Mexican artist David Alfaro Siqueiros, and connects the mural both to the founding of the city in 1781 and to the Rodney King beating in 1991 through its unswerving view of race, ethnicity and class. Even as the image is literally whitewashed, the mural's images and call to action ghost through. It received its world premiere in San Francisco in 2007.

References

External links
 
 

Living people
Year of birth missing (living people)
People from Hollywood, Los Angeles
American writers of Mexican descent
American male dramatists and playwrights
Hispanic and Latino American dramatists and playwrights
21st-century American dramatists and playwrights
Cornell University alumni
Columbia University School of the Arts alumni
University of Southern California faculty
American children's writers
21st-century American male writers